Cheshmeh Khan Mohammad is a village in Cheshmeh Ziarat Rural District, in the Corrin of Zahedan County, Sistan and Baluchestan Province, Iran. At the 2006 census, its population was 87, in 21 families.

References 

Populated places in Zahedan County